Tara Killian (June 21, 1977) is an American film and television actress. She held the Miss United States Teen title in 1994.  Tara attended Irmo High School in Columbia, SC and earned a B.A. in Music from the College of Charleston in Charleston, SC.

Filmography
The Rage: Carrie 2  (1999)
Slaughter Studios  (2002)
Shallow Ground  (2004)
We All Fall Down  (2005)
American Pie Presents Band Camp  (2005)
Mr. Fix It  (2006)
Strangers Online  (2007 - not yet released)

Trivia
 Killian was accepted to medical school, but decided to pursue an acting career instead.

References

External links

Official website

1977 births
Living people
American film actresses
American television actresses
College of Charleston alumni
21st-century American women